Johan Peter Wotapek von Ritterwald (1676–1763 in Tábor) was a judge in Tábor in southern Bohemia. He was ennobled in November 1763 by Maria Theresa of Austria.

References 

People from Tábor District
1676 births
1763 deaths
Bohemian lawyers
Bohemian nobility
18th-century judges
People from Tábor